Pearl Hart (born Pearl Taylor; 1871–1955) was a Canadian-born outlaw of the American Old West. She committed one of the last recorded stagecoach robberies in the United States, and her crime gained notoriety primarily because of her gender. Many details of Hart's life are uncertain, with available reports being varied and often contradictory.

Early life
Hart was born Pearl Taylor in the Canadian village of Lindsay, Ontario. Her parents were both religious and affluent, and these factors provided their daughter with the best available education. At the age of 16, she was enrolled in a boarding school where she became enamored with a young man, named Hart, who has been variously described as a rake, drunkard, and/or gambler.

Hart reconciled with and left her husband several times. During their time together they had two children, a boy and a girl, whom Hart sent to her mother who was then living in Ohio. In 1893, the couple attended the Chicago World's Fair, where he worked for a time as a midway barker. She in turn developed a fascination with the cowboy lifestyle while watching Buffalo Bill's Wild West Show. At the end of the Fair, Hart left her husband again on a train bound for Trinidad, Colorado, possibly in the company of a piano player named Dan Bandman.

During this time Hart worked as a cook and singer, possibly supplementing her income as a demimondaine (prostitute). There are also reports she developed a fondness for cigars, liquor, and morphine during this time.

A variation of this story has Bandman instead of her husband leaving Hart for war.

Life of crime
By early 1898, Hart was in the town of Mammoth, Arizona. Some reports indicate she was working as a cook in a boardinghouse. While doing well for a time, her financial outlook took a downturn after the mine closed. About this time Hart attested to receiving a message asking her to return home to her seriously ill mother.

 
Looking to raise money, Hart and an acquaintance known only as "Joe Boot" (likely an alias) worked an old mining claim he owned, but found no gold in the claim.

The pair decided to rob a stagecoach that traveled between Globe and Florence, Arizona.
The robbery occurred on May 30, 1899, at a watering point near Cane Springs Canyon, about 30 miles southeast of Globe. Hart had cut her hair short and dressed in men's clothing. Hart was armed with a .38 revolver while Boot had a Colt .45. One of the last stagecoach routes still operating in the territory, the run had not been robbed in several years and thus the coach did not have a shotgun messenger. The pair stopped the coach and Boot held a gun on the robbery victims while Hart took $431.20 and two firearms from the passengers. After returning $1 to each passenger, she then took the driver's revolver. After the robbers had galloped away on their horses, the driver unhitched one of the horses and headed back to town to alert the sheriff.

Others claim the pair became lost and wandered in circles. Regardless, a posse led by Sheriff Truman of Pinal County caught up with the pair on June 5, 1899. Finding both of them asleep, Sheriff Truman reported that Boot surrendered quietly while Hart fought to avoid capture.

In and out of jail 

Following their arrest, Boot was held in Florence while Hart was moved to Tucson, the jail lacking any facilities for a woman. The novelty of a female stagecoach robber quickly spawned a media frenzy and national reporters soon joined the local press clamoring to interview and photograph Hart. One article in Cosmopolitan said Hart was "just the opposite of what would be expected of a woman stage robber," though, "when angry or determined, hard lines show about her eyes and mouth". Locals also became fascinated with her, one local fan giving her a bobcat cub to keep as a pet.

Taking advantage of the relatively weak building material, and possibly with the aid of an assistant, Hart escaped on October 12, 1899, leaving an  hole in the wall.

Hart and Boot came to trial for robbing the stagecoach passengers in October 1899. During the trial Hart made an impassioned plea to the jury, claiming she needed the money to be able to go to her ailing mother. Judge Fletcher M. Doan was shocked and angered when the jury found her not guilty and scolded the jurors for failure to perform their duties. Immediately following the acquittal, the pair was rearrested on the charge of tampering with U.S. mail.

Both Hart and Boot were sent to Yuma Territorial Prison to serve their sentences. Boot became a prison trusty, driving supply wagons to chain gangs working outside the walls. One day while driving a wagon he escaped and was never seen again. At the time of his escape, Boot had completed less than two years of his sentence.

The attention Hart had received in jail continued once she was imprisoned. The warden, who enjoyed the attention she attracted, provided her with an oversized  mountainside cell that included a small yard and allowed her to entertain reporters and other guests as well as pose for photographs. Hart, in turn, used her position as the only female at an all-male facility to her advantage, playing admiring guards and prison trusties off of each other in an effort to improve her situation.

Hart's release from prison came in the form of a December 1902 pardon from Arizona Territorial Governor Alexander Brodie. There are accounts that she and the warden were lovers. There is no evidence Hart ever had a third child, so this rumor, if true, may indicate a successful ploy on Hart's part. Upon release from prison, Hart was provided with a train ticket to Kansas City.

Later life

After leaving prison, Hart largely disappeared from public view. She had a short-lived show where she re-enacted her crime and then spoke about the horrors of Yuma Territorial Prison. Following this she worked, under an alias, as part of Buffalo Bill's Wild West Show. In 1904, Hart was running a cigar store in Kansas City when she was arrested for receiving stolen property.

A census taker in 1940 claimed to have discovered Hart living in Arizona under a different name, as she had married again.

In popular culture 

In addition to being a staple of pulp western fiction, Hart's exploits have been featured in other venues. The play Lady with a Gun and the musical The Legend of Pearl Hart are also based upon Hart's story.

Pearl Hart is the main character for the play Waiting Women by Latina playwright Silvia Gonzalez S.

The Danish rock band Volbeat has a song called "Pearl Hart" on the album Outlaw Gentlemen & Shady Ladies, released in 2013.

Further reading 
The foregoing account of Pearl Hart is claimed to be largely fictional.  For another account of her life, see:
 John Boessenecker, Wildcat: The Untold Story of Pearl Hart, the Wild West's Most Notorious Woman Bandit.  New York:  Hanover Square Press (2021)

References

"Pearl Hart and the Last Stage", short story by Edward D. Wood, Jr. published in Outlaws of the Old West, a collection of selected readings by Mankind Magazine, edited by Charles D. Anderson, 1973

External links

  Hart's account of events leading to the robbery.
 

1871 births
20th-century deaths
1899 crimes in the United States
19th-century Canadian people
20th-century Canadian people
19th-century Canadian women
20th-century Canadian women
Canadian emigrants to the United States
Canadian female criminals
Fugitives
Outlaws of the American Old West
People from Kawartha Lakes
People from Trinidad, Colorado
Recipients of American gubernatorial pardons